Ikkanda Warrier (ഇക്കണ്ട വാര്യര്) (1890 – 1977) was the third and the last Prime Minister of the state of Cochin, India, beginning in 1948.

Early life
Warrier was born in 1890 as the member of the Edakkunni Warriam in Ollur, Thrissur. He received his B.A from Madras Christian College, F.L. from Madras Law College, and B.L. from Trivandrum Law College. He set up his legal practice in Thrissur. He was an ardent supporter of the All-India States Peoples' Conference and held many offices in the organization. He is the grand nephew of Diwan of Cochin T. Sankara Warrier. He is regarded as the architect of Peechi Dam, Vazhani Dam and Peringalkuthu Dam in Thrissur District.

References

1890 births
1977 deaths
Politicians from Thrissur
Malayali politicians
Indian independence activists from Kerala
Indian National Congress politicians from Kerala
Chief Ministers of Kerala